George Major (born 1939) is a British former motorcycle speedway rider.

George Major may also refer to:

George Major (cricketer) (1851–1921), Australian cricketer
George D. Major (1819–1902), American politician, businessman and agriculturist
Georg Major (1502–1574), Lutheran theologian
George Maior (born 1967), Romanian politician and diplomat